John Lyon Collyer (18 September 1893 – 24 June 1979)  was an American businessman and chairman of the Board of Trustees at Cornell University. He served as chairman, president, and CEO at B. F. Goodrich and won the Medal for Merit in 1946.

References

Cornell University people
1893 births
1979 deaths
20th-century American academics